The Women's 10 kilometre classical competition at the FIS Nordic World Ski Championships 2019 was held on 20 and 26 February 2019. A qualification was held on 20 February.

Results

Qualification
The qualification was held on 20 February at 12:30.

Final
The race was started at 15:00.

References

Women's 10 kilometre classical